Steve Bratcher is an American politician and educator currently serving as a Republican member of the Kentucky House of Representatives from the 25th House district. His district includes most of Elizabethtown and the north side of Hardin County, minus Radcliff. He defeated Democratic candidate Katherine Leonard in the 2022 Kentucky House of Representatives election, 62.4% to 37.6%.

He works at Elizabethtown Community College as their Director of External Technical Training and teaches business and technical classes.

His cousin, Kevin Bratcher, also serves as member of the Kentucky House of Representatives from District 29.

References

Living people
Republican Party members of the Kentucky House of Representatives
21st-century American politicians
Year of birth missing (living people)